Desulfovibrio piezophilus is a bacterium. It is sulfate-reducing and piezophilic, hence its name. The type strain is C1TLV30(T) ( = DSM 21447(T) = JCM 1548(T)).

References

Further reading
Staley, James T., et al. "Bergey’s manual of systematic bacteriology, vol. 3."Williams and Wilkins, Baltimore, MD (1989): 2250-2251.
Bélaich, Jean-Pierre, Mireille Bruschi, and Jean-Louis Garcia, eds. Microbiology and biochemistry of strict Anaerobes Involved in interspecies hydrogen transfer. No. 54. Springer, 1990.
Pradel, Nathalie, et al. "The first genomic and proteomic characterization of a deep-sea sulfate reducer: insights into the piezophilic lifestyle of Desulfovibrio piezophilus." PLoS ONE 8.1 (2013): e55130.

External links
LPSN

Type strain of Desulfovibrio piezophilus at BacDive -  the Bacterial Diversity Metadatabase

Bacteria described in 2011
Desulfovibrio